The Rockland Almshouse is a historic almshouse at 198 Spring Street in Rockland, Massachusetts.  The large -story L-shaped building was built in 1876, and served as a communal poor house until 1979.  It is a rare well-preserved example of a 19th-century almshouse.  The building was listed on the National Register of Historic Places in 1983.  It is currently used as an educational facility.

Description and history
The almshouse is located south of Rockland's village center, on the east side of Spring Street, a major north-south artery in the southern part of the town.  The main building is an L-shaped -story wood-frame structure, with a gabled roof, clapboard siding, and foundation of brick and rubblestone.  The east–west portion of the L has a single-story hip-roof porch extending on its southern facade, with original turned posts and balustrade.  This facade is five bays wide, with the main entrance at the center bay.  The west-facing gable end is three bays wide, with two sash windows in the gable, three windows on the first level, and two windows flanking a modern emergency exit on the second.  The north–south portion of the building presents five bays to the west, although they are not symmetrical.

The town of Rockland was separated from Abington in 1874, and the need for the almshouse was apparently recognized soon afterward, for the first portion of this building, the east–west section, was built in 1876.  The north–south wing was added in 1899, to provide an infirmary.  The almshouse was closed in 1979 after more than 100 years of operation.  The building has been rehabilitated, and now houses the North River Collaborative, and educational organization for children and young adults with disabilities.

See also
National Register of Historic Places listings in Plymouth County, Massachusetts

References

External links
North River Collaborative web site

Buildings and structures in Rockland, Massachusetts
Residential buildings on the National Register of Historic Places in Massachusetts
Almshouses in the United States
National Register of Historic Places in Plymouth County, Massachusetts
Housing in Massachusetts